The Department for Communities (DfC, Irish: An Roinn Pobal, Ulster Scots: Depairtment fur Commonities) is a devolved Northern Ireland government department in the Northern Ireland Executive.  The minister with overall responsibility for the department is the Minister for Communities. The department was previously created in May 2016 following the Fresh Start Agreement and the dissolution of several departments, such as the Department for Social Development, the Department of the Environment, the Department of Culture, Arts and Leisure and the Department for Employment and Learning from which several functions have amalgamated.

Aim
DfC's overall aim is "tackling disadvantage and building sustainable communities".

Responsibilities
The department's main responsibilities are as follows:
 housing (through the Northern Ireland Housing Executive)
 social security and welfare
 employment services
 culture, sports and leisure
 historic and cultural affairs

Northern Ireland has parity with Great Britain in three areas:
 social security
 child support
 pensions

Policy in these areas is technically devolved but, in practice, follows policy set by Parliament to provide consistency across the United Kingdom.

The department is also responsible for the following public bodies:
 Northern Ireland Housing Executive
 Charity Commission for Northern Ireland
 Disability Living Allowance Advisory Board for Northern Ireland
 Rent Assessment Panel
 Vaughan Charity

It also oversees the Office of the Social Fund Commissioner.

DfC's main counterparts in the United Kingdom Government are:
 the Department for Work and Pensions (on social security);
 the Department for Communities and Local Government (on housing and urban regeneration);
 the Cabinet Office (on the voluntary and community sector);
 the Department for Culture, Media and Sport (on gambling and alcohol licensing).

In the Irish Government, its main counterparts are:
 the Department of Social Protection
 the Department of Housing, Local Government and Heritage (on housing)
 the Department of Justice (on gambling)

History
Housing policy in Northern Ireland was originally a responsibility of local government and the Ministry of Home Affairs, which (similarly to the Home Office) retained responsibility for policy areas not delegated to other ministries.

A separate Ministry of Health and Local Government was established in June 1944, as part of the welfare state.  In January 1965, that department was divided between the Ministry of Development (including housing policy) and the Ministry of Health and Social Services (including social security).

The two ministries were, respectively, renamed as the Department of the Environment and Department of Health and Social Services (DHSS) under direct rule, introduced in March 1972.  Health and social services and environment ministries were also included in the Northern Ireland Executive briefly established in 1974.

DfC mainly combined housing and social security policy from those departments.
The initials DHSS are still used locally to describe benefits and benefit claimants.

Following a referendum on the Belfast Agreement on 23 May 1998 and the granting of royal assent to the Northern Ireland Act 1998 on 19 November 1998, a Northern Ireland Assembly and Northern Ireland Executive were established by the United Kingdom Government under Prime Minister Tony Blair. The process was known as devolution and was set up to return devolved legislative powers to Northern Ireland.

DfC (then DSD) was one of five new devolved Northern Ireland departments created in December 1999 by the Northern Ireland Act 1998 and The Departments (Northern Ireland) Order 1999.

A devolved minister first took office on 2 December 1999.  Devolution was suspended for four periods, during which the department came under the responsibility of direct rule ministers from the Northern Ireland Office:
 between 12 February 2000 and 30 May 2000;
 on 11 August 2001;
 on 22 September 2001;
 between 15 October 2002 and 8 May 2007.

Since 8 May 2007, devolution has operated without interruption, however it was not operating in practice from 2017 to 2020.

Ministers for Communities

Direct rule ministers
During the periods of suspension, the following ministers of the Northern Ireland Office were responsible for the department:
 George Howarth (2000)
 Des Browne (2002–03)
 John Spellar (2003–05)
 David Hanson (2005–07)

See also
 Committee for Communities
 Líofa

Notes

References

External links
 Department for Communities
  

Northern Ireland Executive